Keith Sutton may refer to

 Keith Sutton (1924–1991), British artist and critic 
 Keith Sutton (politician) (1896–1973), Australian politician
 Keith Sutton (bishop) (1934–2017), British clergyman

See also  
 Sutton
 Sutton (surname)